Modern Institute of Engineering & Technology, popularly known as MIET, is a private institute located at Bandel, Hooghly in West Bengal. The college was established in the year 2010 under the aegis of the Badal Deb Memorial Educational Foundation.The institute is approved by All India Council of Technical Education (AICTE) and affiliated to Maulana Abul Kalam Azad University of Technology (formerly WBUT).

Disciplines
The Institute conducts 4 years B. Tech. Degree courses in: Computer Science and Engineering (CSE), Electronics and Communication Engineering (ECE), Electrical Engineering (EE), Civil Engineering (CE), Mechanical Engineering (ME).

In the academic year 2014-15, MIET has introduced diploma programme in Electrical Engineering (DEE) and Mechanical Engineering(DME) under the auspices of West Bengal State Council of Technical Education.

Facilities
The institute has a library, which- besides books, journals, magazines & newspapers – houses a 100-seater reading room. The current repertoire is 16857 books (1354 titles) for B.Tech. and 2655 books (158 titles) for Polytechnic.

MIET operates its own fleet of buses and cars for the ease of travel from and to Bandel Railway station for students, parents, staff, faculty and guests. These ply at regular intervals during morning and evening hours under strict supervision.

See also

References

External links 
 http://www.mietcollege.org

Engineering colleges in West Bengal
Universities and colleges in Hooghly district
2010 establishments in West Bengal
Educational institutions established in 2010